Genisys may refer to:

 Genisys Credit Union, a credit union based in Auburn Hills, Michigan.
 Genisys, a former research project set up by the Information Awareness Office.
 Terminator Genisys, the fifth installment in the Terminator series of films

See also

 Genesys (disambiguation)
 Genesis (disambiguation)